Porphyromonas bennonis  is a Gram-negative, anaerobic and non-spore-forming  bacterium from the genus of Porphyromonas which has been isolated from human clinical specimens.

References 

Bacteroidia
Bacteria described in 2009